USS Carlotta (SP-1785) was a United States Navy patrol vessel in service from 1917 to 1918.

Carlotta was built as a civilian motorboat of the same name. In August 1917, the U.S. Navy obtained her from her owner, the Commonwealth of Virginia, for use as a section patrol boat during World War I. She was placed in service as USS Carlotta (SP-1785).

Assigned to the 5th Naval District, Carlotta performed patrol duty at Cape Charles and radio inspection duty at Newport News, Virginia, for the rest of World War I.

The Navy returned Carlotta to the Commonwealth of Virginia in October 1918.

References
 
 SP-1785 Carlotta at Department of the Navy Naval History and Heritage Command Online Library of Selected Images: U.S. Navy Ships -- Listed by Hull Number: "SP" #s and "ID" #s -- World War I Era Patrol Vessels and other Acquired Ships and Craft numbered from ID # 1700 through ID # 1799
 NavSource Online: Section Patrol Craft Photo Archive Carlottan (SP 1785)

Patrol vessels of the United States Navy
World War I patrol vessels of the United States